Heath's Meadows is a local nature reserve with an area of over  located in Burgh le Marsh, Lincolnshire, England. It was acquired by the Trust in 1969. The site was originally called Bratoft Meadows but was re-named in honour of Winifred Heath, a LWT fundraiser. The grassland meadows contain many flowers, including: cowslips, green-winged orchid, spotted orchid, adder's tongue, and dyer's greenweed.

References

Local Nature Reserves in Lincolnshire
Tourist attractions in Lincolnshire
Lincolnshire Wildlife Trust
East Lindsey District